The 2005–06 Wessex Football League was the 20th season of the Wessex Football League. The league champions for the second time in their history were Winchester City, who were promoted to the Southern League along with runners-up Thatcham Town and third-placed Andover. The extra promotions were because of the pyramid reorganisations that took place in 2006.

There was a full programme of promotion and relegation between the three Wessex League divisions. Promotion from the lower divisions was largely based on ground grading, rather than league finishing positions. This was protested by Division Two champions Locks Heath and Division Three champions Paulsgrove, but the league stuck with their decision to promote lower-placed clubs with better facilities.

For sponsorship reasons, the league was known as the Sydenhams Wessex League.

League tables

Division One
Division One consisted of 22 clubs, the same as the previous season, after Lymington & New Milton were promoted to the Isthmian League, Downton were relegated and two new clubs joined:
Lymington Town, champions of Division Two.
Poole Town, runners-up in Division Two.

Division Two
Division Two also consisted of 22 clubs, the same as the previous season, after Lymington Town and Poole Town were promoted to Division One, A.F.C. Aldermaston were relegated to Division Three, and three new clubs joined:
Downton, relegated from Division One.
Farnborough North End, third-placed club in Division Three.
Hayling United, runners-up in Division Three.

Division Three
Division Three consisted of 17 clubs, reduced from 22 the previous season, after DC, Ludgershall Sports, RS Basingstoke and Yateley Green left the league, and Hayling United and Farnborough North End were promoted to Division Two. One new club joined:
A.F.C. Aldermaston, relegated from Division Two.

References

Wessex Football League seasons
9